Knife play is a form of consensual BDSM edgeplay involving knives, daggers, and swords as a source of physical and mental stimulation. Knives are typically used to cut away clothing, scratch the skin, remove wax after wax play, or simply provide sensual stimulation. Knife play can also be a form of temperature play or body modification.

Knife play is sometimes, but not always, a form of fear play. The "victim" in some cases, is shown a sharp implement, and then blindfolded, and a blunt knife used on their skin (for example: the practice of insertive sex play without the certain knowledge of the submissive that an exchange of implements—blunt for sharp—has occurred. This is a form of fear play, yet it still maintains some degree of safety).

For some, knife play can be highly erotic, as the physical and psychological reactions can be intense. It is also an activity that takes a great amount of care to learn properly. As with any sort of edge play that can potentially draw blood, there is the risk of passing diseases along. Also, there is the risk of cutting the wrong spot and causing excessive blood loss, or accidental stabbing.

References
 Miranda Austin and Sam Atwood (2005). The Toybag Guide to Erotic Knifeplay. San Francisco: Greenery Press. . . .

BDSM terminology